A bowling shirt is a style of camp shirt in which the fabric, color and design vary greatly, but frequently incorporate contrasting earth tones and simple geometric designs, with more expensive ones often made of silk.  They may have a single pocket on the left—small logos or monogram initials are also common options on the left breast.

The shirt is associated most directly with ten-pin bowling but they are also associated with bar culture, billiards culture and rockabilly, ska, and jump blues music.  The Two and a Half Men character Charlie Harper, portrayed by Charlie Sheen, often wears two-tone bowling shirts.

References

Ten-pin bowling
Tops (clothing)
Shirts